Jowzam Rural District is a rural district (dehestan) in Dehaj District, Shahr-e Babak County, Kerman Province, Iran. At the 2006 census, its population was (including Jowzam, was subsequently split off from the rural district and promoted to city status) was 10,659, in 2,256 families; excluding Jowzam, the population (as of 2006) was 2,710, in 761 families. The rural district has 51 villages.

References 

Rural Districts of Kerman Province
Shahr-e Babak County